Tufano is a surname. Notable people with the surname include:

Brian Tufano (1939–2023), English cinematographer
Dennis Tufano (born 1946), American singer
Peter Tufano (born 1957), American academic administrator